T. P. Madhavan (born 7 November 1935) is an Indian actor who appeared in Malayalam films.  He started acting at the age of 40. He has acted in more than 600 films. He came into the film industry playing villain roles; later he started doing comedy roles and then switched to character roles.

Background
Madhavan was born as the eldest son to N. P. Pillai and Saraswathi in Trivandrum. He has a brother, Narayanan and a sister, Radhamani. He is the nephew of the veteran dramatist T. N. Gopinathan Nair and grandson of the eminent linguist Sahithyapanchanan P. K. Narayana Pillai. His father was the Dean at Kerala University. He pursued Post graduation in sociology from Dr. Bhim Rao Ambedkar University, formerly Agra University. He got selected into the Indian army but had to withdraw when his hands got fractured after selection. Later he worked in an English Newspaper in Bombay during 1960. Then he started an advertising agency in Bangalore.  His first movie was Raagam in 1975. He was secretary of Malayalam movie artists association AMMA during 1994 -1997 and joint Secretary during 2000–2006.

He was married to Sudha but his marriage ended in divorce. They have a son, Raja Krishna Menon and daughter, Devika. His son is a noted film director in Bollywood.

It is said that he had a stroke. Now he lives in Gandhi Bhavan, Pathanapuram in Kollam district.

Filmography

 2016 Maalgudi Days
 2013 Pigman 
 2012 Spirit
 2012 Cinema Company
 2012 Ordinary
 2010 Ayalum Njanum Thammil
 2012 Simhasanam 
 2012 The King & the Commissioner
 2011 Indian Rupee as Swami 
 2011 Sarkar Colony 
 2011 Collector as Sankaran Nampoothiri 
 2011 Karayilekku Oru Kadal Dooram as Kunjettan 
 2010 Chekavar as  Madhavan
 2010 Happy Husbands
 2010 Drona 2010
 2010 Oru Naal Varum
 2010 Marykkundoru Kunjaadu
 2010 Alexander The Great 
 2009 Passenger
 2009 Colours as Man at the party
 2009 Kappal Muthalaali
 2009 Robin Hood as Minister Manjooran
 2009 Evidam Swargamanu 
 2009 Swantham Lekhakan as Chief Minister
 2009 Red Chillies 
 2008 Twenty:20 as Francis
 2008 Thirakkatha as Dr Sreenivasan
 2008 Malabar Wedding asThampi 
 2008 College Kumaran 
 2008 Roudram as ASI Ayyappan Nair 
 2007 Kangaroo as Paul K. Mani
 2007 Aakasham
 2007 Time as Director General of Police
 2007 Athisayan
 2007 Ayurrekha 
 2007 Mayavi as Home Minister
 2007 Detective 
 2007 Inspector Garud as Ramakrishnan
 2007 Panthaya Kozhi as Settu
 2007 Romeoo as Venkidi
 2006 Arunam
 2006 Vaasthavam
 2006 Prajapathi as Appa Swami
 2006 Balram vs. Tharadas
 2006 Lanka
 2006 The Don 
 2006 Lion
 2006 Rashtram as Damodharan Pilla
 2005 Rajamanikyam as College Principal
 2005 Boyy Friennd as Leader K.R
 2005 Bharathchandran I.P.S. as Vakkalam Moosa 
 2005 Pandippada as Bhuvanachandran's Father 
 2005 Pauran as Narayanan
 2005 Thaskara Veeran as Ramkumar
 2005 Kochi Rajavu as College Principal
 2005 Udayananu Tharam as Bhaskarettan
 2005 Anandabhadram
 2004 Vesham as Judge
 2004 Black 
 2004 Natturajavu as Secretary 
 2004 Wanted as Politician 
 2004 Chathikkatha Chanthu 
 2004 Vismayathumbathu as Hospital Patient
 2004 Udayam
 2003 Parinamam (The Change)
 2004 Ennittum
 2003 Manassinakkare as Advocate 
 2003 Pulival Kalyanam as Prasad 
 2003 Hariharan Pillai Happy Aanu as Rosario 
 2003 Melvilasam Sariyanu as Dr. Ananda Shankar 
 2003 Gramaphone 
 2003 Choonda as Gopalan
 2002 Kalyanaraman 
 2002 Yathrakarude Sradhakku as K.K. Karthikeyan
 2002 Desam 
 2002 Jagathy Jagadeesh in Town as Amar Baba Settu
 2002 Sivam as Yasodharan
 2002 Thandavam as Warrier
 2002 Nammal 
 2001 One Man Show 
 2001 Achaneyanenikkishtam as Nambeeshan 
 2001 Nariman as Akhilesh Avasti
 2001 Layam 
 2001 Raavanaprabhu as Nambyar
 2001 Kakkakuyil
 2000 Arayannangalude Veedu as Neena's Dad 
 2000 Cover Story
 2000 Madhuranombarakattu
 2000 Narasimham as Raman Nair
 2000 Nadanpennum Nattupramani 
 2000 Pilots as The Priest
 2000 Kharaksharangal 
 2000 The Warrant as Annie's father
 1999 Stalin Shivadas as Leader
 1999 Ezhupunna Tharakan as  Mahadevan 
 1999 Friends as Poonkulathu Damodara Menon 
 1999 Pallavur Devanarayanan
 1999 Panchapandavar as Kumaran Asan
 1999 Pathram as Harivamsilal Pannalal
 1999 English Medium 
 1999 The Godman
 1998 Ayal Kadha Ezhuthukayanu as Police Sub Inspector 
 1998 Daya as Hussain
 1998 Kusruthi Kuruppu 
 1998 Mayilpeelikkavu
 1998 Ayushman Bawa 
 1998 Oro Viliyum Kathorthu as Judge
 1998 Kaikudanna Nilavu 
 1997 Aaraam Thampuran as Sharody
 1997 Janathipathyam as Kaimal
 1997 Kadhanayakan as Krishna Menon 
 1997 Lelam as C. K. Balakrishnan 
 1997 Superman as Home Minister 
 1996 Madamma as Electricity Board Engineer 
 1995 Oru Abhibhashakante Case Diary as Pothuval 
 1995 Mazhayethum Munpe as Narayanan Nair 
 1995 Agnidevan as Kochammini's Brother
 1995 Punnaram 
 1995 Aksharam as Madhava Menon
 1995 Kaatttile Thadi Thevarude Ana as Madhavan 
 1995 Sakshyam as Amavan 
 1995 Thacholi Varghese Chekavar 
 1995 Vrudhanmare Sookshikkuka as Thommichan
 1994 Bhagyavan
 1994 Avan Ananthapadmanabhan
 1994 Minnaram 
 1994 Manathe Vellitheru as Underworld Don
 1994 Pavam I. A. Ivachan 
 1994 Pingami as News Paper Editor
 1994 Sukam Sukhakaram 
 1994 Varanamaalyam as Govindan Nair
 1994 Chukkan as Tehsildar
 1994 Rudraksham as Appunni Nair
 1993 Vakkel Vasudev 
 1993 Journalist as Minister
 1993 Bhagyavan as Security Guard
 1993 Maya Mayuram
 1993 Bhoomi Geetham as Driver Shivaraman
 1992 Pappayude Swantham Appoos
 1992 Mahanagaram as Hassan Ravuthar
 1992 Vietnam Colony as Krishnamurthy's Ammavan
 1992 Thiruthalvaadi
 1991 Adayalam as MK Kesavan
 1991 Apoorvam Chilar as Chandran
 1991 Chanchattam as G. Raveendranath
 1991 Cheppu Kilukkunna Changathi as Bank Manager
 1991 Avanikunnile Kinnarippookkal
 1991 Nettippattam
 1991 Ulladakkam
 1991 Sandesham as Police Officer
 1991 Kizhakkunarum Pakshi as Pilla
 1990 Kalikkalam as Thomas 
 1990 Mukham as Usha's Father 
 1990 Randam Varavu as Public Prosecutor
 1990 Thalayanamanthram as Company Manager
 1990 Vachanam
 1990 Vyooham as Settu
 1990 Maruppuram 
 1989 Innale as Swamy
 1988 Mrithyunjayam 
 1988 Oru CBI Diary Kurippu as Sreedharan 
 1988 Moonnam Mura as Panikkar 
 1987 Adimakal Udamakal as Minister 
 1987 Achuvettante Veedu as Rugmini's Brother 
 1987 Jaalakam as Kurup Mash 
 1987 Sarvakalashala as Psychiatrist
 1987 Theertham
 1987 Nadodikkattu
 1987 Sruthi as Pillai
 1987 Vrutham as Prasad
 1987 Kalam Mari Katha Mari as Mammali
 1986 Rareeram as Man At the Bank 
 1986 Sunil Vayassu 20 as Sunil's Father
 1986 Vivahitare Itihile
 1986 Koodanayum Kattu 
 1985 Akalathe Ambili as Menon
 1985 Eeran Sandhya as Avarachan
 1985 Ente Ammu Ninte Thulasi Avarude Chakki 
 1984 Arante Mulla Kochu Mulla as Sankunny Menon 
 1984 Uyarangalil as Dr. Varghese
 1983 Aana as Mathachan
 1981 Manasinte Theerthayathra
 1981 Kolilakkam
 1981 Archana Teacher 
 1981 Thaaravu as Kunjappi
 1980 Aniyatha Valakkal as Panikkar
 1980 Deepam
 1980 Ashwaradham
 1980 Arangum Aniyarayum as Robert
 1980 Sakthi as Michael
 1980 Vaiki Vanna Vasantham 
 1979 Aavesham
 1979 Avalude Prathikaram
 1979 Allauddinum Albhutha Vilakkum as Abdulla
 1979 Oru Ragam Pala Thalam
 1979 Enikku Njaan Swantham as Madhavankutty
 1979 Agnivyooham
 1979 Kaliyankkattuneeli
 1978 Sthree Oru Dukham
 1978 Aanakkalari
 1978 Iniyum Puzhayozhukum as Doctor 
 1978 Kalpavriksham as Rani's father
 1978 Kudumbam Namukku Sreekovil 
 1978 Anuboothikalude Nimisham
 1978 Nivedyam as Advocate
 1977 Aval Oru Devalayam
 1977 Satyavan Savithri
 1977 Aparadhi as Kumaran
 1977 Samudram as Police Inspector
 1977 Anugraham as Collector T. P. Madhavan
 1977 Niraparayum Nilavilakkum
 1977 Jagadguru Adishankaran 
 1977 Achaaram Ammini Osharam Omana as Pankajakshan
 1976 Mohiniyattam 
 1976 Dheere Sameere Yamuna Theere as Dr. Kuttikrishnan
 1976 Chirikkudukka as Gopalan Nair
 1976 Yakshaganam
 1976 Light House as Bhaskaran Nair
 1975 Chief Guest
 1975 Chandanachola
 1975 Love Marriage as Police officer
 1975 Loveletter
 1975 Penpada
 1975 Kaamam Krodham Moham
 1975 Ragam

Television serials
 Daya ( Asianet )
Kabani (Zee Keralam)
 Chechiyamma (Surya TV)
 Aluvayum Mathikariyum (Asianet Plus)
 Moonnumani (Flowers TV)
 Pattu Saree (Mazhavil Manorama)
  Aa Amma (Kairali TV)
Vigraham (Asianet)
  Sthree Oru Santhwanam (Asianet)
 Ente Manasaputhri (Asianet)
 Mahathma Gandhi Colony (Surya TV)
Manthrakodi (Asianet)
 Priyamanasi (Surya TV)
 Vishudha Thomasleeha (Asianet)
 Swami Ayyapan (Asianet)
 Kadamattathu Kathanar (Asianet)
Valayam (DD)

References

External links

 http://www.metromatinee.com/artist/T%20P%20Madhavan-295
 http://www.mallumovies.org/artist/tp-madhavan
 http://cinidiary.com/peopleinfo.php?sletter=M&pigsection=Actor&picata=1
 T.P.Madhavan at MSI

Living people
Indian male film actors
Male actors from Thiruvananthapuram
Male actors in Malayalam cinema
Malayalam comedians
Indian male comedians
20th-century Indian male actors
21st-century Indian male actors
Indian male television actors
Male actors in Malayalam television
1935 births